Aru may refer to:

One of the Aru languages of Indonesia
Amol language of Papua New Guinea
A dialect of Guhu-Samane of Papua New Guinea
Aru, another name for the Aymaran languages, central Andes